Josue Wildor Paul (born November 14, 1988) is an American former gridiron football wide receiver. He was drafted by the Kansas City Chiefs in the seventh round of the 2011 NFL Draft. He played college football at Central Connecticut State University (CCSU).

Paul was also a member of the Indianapolis Colts, Buffalo Bills, Denver Broncos, Hamilton Tiger-Cats, Calgary Stampeders, and Green Bay Packers.

Early years
At a young age Paul enjoyed playing many different sports engaging in many different fitness activities. Paul began playing football at the age of 6 and quickly became serious pursuing football as a career path. Paul graduated from Pope John Paul II High School in Boca Raton, Florida in 2007. He was an avid student; involved in multiple programs in school, he was a letterman in football, basketball, and track, and a member of the Five Thousand Role Models of Excellence Program. In high school, he achieved second-team all-county and third-team all-state, he was also awarded the teams most improved player.

College career
In 2007 Paul committed to Central Connecticut State University. Beginning in his college career he was placed as the starting returner and took a few snaps as a wide receiver. By his senior year he was leading his team as wide receiver. 
 2007: HIs freshman year, he averaged 21.9 yards per return on kickoffs and caught two passes for 29 yards and a touchdown. In the 2007 season he had a 95-yard return for touchdown in a win over Southern Connecticut.
 2008: Paul averaged 20.3 return yards and caught 23 passes for 372 yards and a touchdown. He returned an 86-yard touchdown at Robert Morris.
 2009: Paul was a First-team All-Conference selection, he led the team with 55 catches for 1036 yards and five touchdowns he averaged 15.2 yards per catch. On return Paul averaged 23 yards and returned a 95-yard touchdown against Robert Morris.
 2010: Paul was named Preseason All-Conference, however, due to injury his season was cut short, but before his injury he had 19 catches for 498 yards and five touchdowns.

Professional career

2011 NFL Combine

Kansas City Chiefs
Paul was signed by the Kansas City Chiefs on July 26, 2011 signed Paul to a three-year, $1.39 million contract that included a signing bonus of $80,000.
The Chiefs waived Paul on September 3, 2011. After he cleared waivers, he was signed to the Chiefs practice squad.

Indianapolis Colts 
Paul was signed to the practice squad of the Indianapolis Colts on December 16, 2011. On January 19 Paul signed a reserve future contract.

Milwaukee Mustangs
Paul was assigned to the Milwaukee Mustangs on November 9, 2011. He recorded 18 receptions for 269 yards and five touchdowns during the 2012 season.

Denver Broncos
The Denver Broncos signed Paul to the practice squad on September 28, 2012 He was released by the Broncos on August 31, 2013.

Iowa Barnstormers
Paul was assigned to the Iowa Barnstormers on February 5, 2013 and exempted on February 6, 2013. He was placed on the refused to report list May 3 and acitavted on June 19, 2013. He was placed on the refused to report list on June 20, 2013.

Calgary Stampeders
Paul signed with the Calgary Stampeders on May 27, 2013. He was released by the Stampeders on June 16, 2014.

Green Bay Packers

On February 2, 2015, the Packers announced that Paul had signed a 3-year, $1.575 million contract with the team. Only $25,000 of his contract was guaranteed for 2015, and he did not receive a signing bonus.

On September 5, 2015, the Green Bay Packers announced they had cut Paul from the team. He signed to the Packers' practice squad on September 6. After the season ended, Paul was not signed to a future/reserve contract by Green Bay, and became a free agent on January 12, 2016.

After football
After his professional career in football, Paul pursued a career in exercise science. In 2013 Paul and Jeff Logan, body builder and former teammate at Central Connecticut State University, began the creation of a new fitness business called Become Fitness. The gym is in the works and plans to launch the summer of 2014. Paul and Logan are ecstatic upon the launch of something they have dreamed since they were teammates in college.

References

External links
 Just Sports Stats

Living people
1988 births
American football wide receivers
Canadian football wide receivers
African-American players of American football
African-American players of Canadian football
Central Connecticut Blue Devils football players
Kansas City Chiefs players
Milwaukee Mustangs (2009–2012) players
Iowa Barnstormers players
Calgary Stampeders players
Players of American football from Florida
People from Delray Beach, Florida
21st-century African-American sportspeople
20th-century African-American people